Alt Meteln is a municipality in the Nordwestmecklenburg district, in Mecklenburg-Vorpommern, Germany.

Geography
The municipality lies 15 kilometers north of Schwerin. The local landscape is glacial carved and the Schweriner See and the Stepenitz are located east and west of Alt Meteln respectively. The Auchbach flows by the municipality towards Schwerin.

History
The first mention of the municipality dates back to 1284 when it was mentioned as a small village. A Gothic brick church located in the municipality dates back to the 13th century.

References

External links 
 Gemeinde Alt Meteln 

Nordwestmecklenburg
Grand Duchy of Mecklenburg-Schwerin